Vientiane Capital F.C. was a Laotian professional football club based in Vientiane, that competed in the Lao Premier League, the top tier of Football in Laos until 2018.

Honours

Lao Premier League
Winners (2): 2005, 2006
Prime Minister's Cup
Winners (1): 2004

References

External links
Vientiane Football Federation Official Facebook page

Football clubs in Laos